Caguas Pueblo is a barrio and downtown area that serves the administrative center (seat) of the city and municipality of Caguas, a municipality of Puerto Rico. It is bordered by the Cagüitas River to the north and located two miles southwest of the Grande de Loiza River. Its population in 2010 was 22,406.

As was customary in Spain, in Puerto Rico, the municipality has a barrio called pueblo (barrio-pueblo starting with the 1990 US Census) which contains a central plaza or main town square, the municipal buildings (such as the city hall), and a Catholic church. Fiestas patronales (patron saint festivals) are held in the main town square every year. The municipal and mayoral offices were located in the City Hall building at the western edge of the main town square until 2010 when a new City Hall building located in the northwestern side of the downtown area was inaugurated.

Geography 
Caguas Pueblo (Spanish: Pueblo de Caguas), officially designated as Caguas Barrio-pueblo and popularly referred to as Downtown Caguas in English, is located in the middle plains of the Caguas Valley. It is bordered by the Cagüitas River to the north, the Loíza River to the east and the Turabo River to the south.

History
The area where downtown Caguas is located today was originally inhabited by the Taíno people. This area of the valley was ideal for the cultivation of crops, such as cassava, due to the fertile river-fed soil. At the time of the Spanish colonization the local tribes were led by the cacique Caguax, from whom the Spanish settlement of San Sebastián del Piñal de Caguax got its name. This village was granted town privileges in 1812 and its first city hall was built in 1820 when it received the title of Villa y cabeza de distrito de Provincia de España ("Villa and District headquarters of a Spanish province"). The village was finally granted full city rights in 1894.

Puerto Rico was ceded by Spain in the aftermath of the Spanish–American War under the terms of the Treaty of Paris of 1898 and became an unincorporated territory of the United States. In 1899, the United States Department of War conducted a census of Puerto Rico finding that the population of Caguas Pueblo was 5,450. The area was heavily damaged by San Felipe Segundo (also known as the 1928 Okeechobee hurricane) in 1928 and many historical buildings were demolished then, which is why many of the older buildings, such as the cathedral, date from the 1930s after many rebuilding projects in the downtown took place.

The central plaza and its church

The main town square of Caguas is named . This is one of the largest main town squares or plazas in Puerto Rico. The central plaza or square, is a public space that is often used for official and unofficial recreational events and is a place where people can gather and socialize from dusk to dawn. The Laws of the Indies, Spanish law, which regulated life in Puerto Rico in the early 19th century, stated the plaza's purpose was for "the parties" (celebrations, festivities), and that the square should be proportionally large enough for the number of neighbors. These Spanish regulations also stated that the streets nearby should be comfortable portals for passersby, protecting them from the elements: sun and rain.

A hermitage was built in 1626 and by 1775 it had been renamed to its current name. In 1830 the construction of a church made of masonry began. The church was used until 1928 when it was damaged by San Felipe Segundo hurricane. Having sustained too much damage, it was demolished and reconstructed starting in 1936 based on an architectural design by Pedro Méndez and Joseph O'Kelly. The church was restored in 1999. In 1964 the church became a cathedral.

Landmarks and places of interest 

 Aguayo Aldea Vocational High School, historical Art Deco building from 1939 listed on the National Register of Historic Places.
Caguas Cathedral Dulce Nombre de Jesús, the historical Catholic cathedral of the Diocese of Caguas.
 Caguas Museum of Art, housed in a historic building known as Casa Amarilla.
 Caguas Museum of Folk Arts, dedicated to the popular arts and crafts of Caguas and Puerto Rico.
 Caguas Museum of History in the old city hall.
Caguas Museum of Tobacco, dedicated to the history of tobacco in Caguas and the Caribbean.
Centro Criollo de Ciencias y Tecnología del Caribe, a science and technology institution hosting special educational events, a museum, science and engineering workshops and a movie theater.
Centro de Bellas Artes de Caguas, the municipal center for performing arts which houses one of the largest theaters in Puerto Rico.
 First Baptist Church of Caguas, historic church and museum.
Gautier Benítez High School, historical Neoclassical building from 1924 also listed on the National Register of Historic Places.
La Asturiana, a historical bakery and café.
Las Catalinas Mall, located in the former Central Santa Catalina sugarcane plantation and refinery.
 Logia Unión y Amparo No. 44, historic masonic lodge.
 Old Telegraph at the Casa del Rey building next to the city hall.
Panadería La Française, a popular bakery turned into a restaurant (Eiffel Café) and pizza parlor (Farinole Pizza & Bar), popular with locals and visitors alike.
Paseo de las Artes Abelardo Díaz Alfaro, a promenade located next to the Caguas Center for Performing Arts, popular for its nightlife and social events.
Paseo Gautier Benítez, a pedestrian street with stores, restaurants and bars.
Plaza del Mercado de Caguas, the city's main marketplace which today houses food stores, restaurants, private offices and often hosts cultural events.
Plaza Juan Corujo Collazo, a small square and recreational park.
Taíno Heritage Monument, popularly known as La India de Caguas.

Gallery
Places in Caguas barrio-pueblo:

See also

 List of communities in Puerto Rico

References

Barrios of Caguas, Puerto Rico